Dirty Hari is a 2020 Indian Telugu-language erotic romantic thriller film written and directed by M. S. Raju. The film was produced by Guduru Siva Rama, Guduru Sateesh Babu and Guduru Sai Puneeth under their production banner, SPJ Creations. It casts Shravan Reddy, Ruhani Sharma and Simrat Kaur in lead roles. The film premiered through ATT Friday Movies App on 18 December 2020. This movie is loosely inspired from the 2005 movie Match Point.

Premise
Hari is a young man who enters into an illicit affair with an aspiring actress named Jasmine just as Vasudha falls in love with him. Post his marriage with Vasudha, Hari continues his secretive relationship with Jasmine.

Cast 
 Shravan Reddy as Hari
 Ruhani Sharma as Vasudha
 Simrat Kaur as Jasmine
 Roshan Basheer as Akash
 Ajay as ACP. Ajay
 Surekha Vani as Prameela 
 Appaji Ambarisha Darbar as Ravishankar

Production

Development 
Dirty Hari marks M. S. Raju's directorial return after his 2012 film Tuneega Tuneega. In an interview with Deccan Chronicle, Raju was quoted: "...[the bold scenes] will be shown in a poetic way. Filmmakers like Bharathan, Puttanna Kanagal, etc., have made several classical bold films in an aesthetic way. I was inspired by them and wanted to try something different." He aimed the film for an audience aged 15-35. The director said the film uses "a blend of several emotions; however, to make it more engaging to the audience we are making sure that the re-recording will aptly complement the narrative and engage the audience".

Casting 
In an interview with The Hindu, Simrat Kaur stated her character to be bold and confident. She compared to that of Deepika Padukone's role in 2012 Hindi film Cocktail. The auditioning team was not initially convinced with her looks. For her, on screen kissing, wearing lingerie, dialogues in a husky tone was difficult sans Telugu dialect.

In an interview with The Times of India, the lead actor Shravan was skeptical to sign the "bold" film. When he first heard the script, he was wary of erotic thrillers need to be handled very carefully. He described his character role as "a chess player who works part-time as a coach in a reputed chess club." In the film he plays "an ambitious guy who will go to any lengths to achieve".

Filming 
Principal photography was delayed the production house was looking for established female lead. Filming completed in Hyderabad by end of November 2019. There are scenes in the film that were shot for 23 hours at a stretch. Simrat Kaur completed her filming portions in 20 days.

Music 

The soundtrack album and original score is composed Mark K. Robin. The background score was recorded in February 2020. The first single titled "Let's Make Love" written by Krishna Kanth and sung by Manisha Eerabathini was released on 24 July 2020.

Reception 
Neeshita Nyayapati of The Times of India wrote that "Dirty Hari is old wine in a new bottle for the most part, with some redeeming parts. Give it a try if erotic thrillers are your cup of tea."

References

External links 
 

Indian romantic thriller films
2020 films
2020s Telugu-language films
2020s romantic thriller films
2020s erotic thriller films
2020 thriller films
Films directed by M. S. Raju